Minister for Gaelic was a Junior minister post in the Scottish Government. Gaelic now lies in the responsibility of the Scottish Government, having been in control of the Scottish Office prior to 1999.

Ministers of Gaelic also have had another portfolio, whilst being Minister of Gaelic.

The post was discontinued under the second Sturgeon government, having come under the remit of the Education Secretary. This has been a cause of controversy amongst Gaelic speaking groups and communities.

Ministers 

Ministers of the Scottish Government
Scottish Gaelic language